Alizé Cornet and Janette Husárová were the defending champions, but Husárová chose not to participate this year.Cornet partnered with Eleni Daniilidou, but lost in the first round to Sharon Fichman and Katalin Marosi.

Alisa Kleybanova and Monica Niculescu won in the final 6–4, 7–6(7–5) against Alona Bondarenko and Kateryna Bondarenko.

Seeds

Draw

External links
Draw

GDF Suez Grand Prix - Doubles
GDF Suez Grand Prix - Doubles
Budapest Grand Prix